Providence Road station (formerly Bowling Green) is a SEPTA Route 101 trolley stop in Media, Pennsylvania. It is officially located at Providence Road (PA 252) and State Street.

Trolleys arriving at this station travel between 69th Street Terminal in Upper Darby, Pennsylvania and Orange Street in Media. The station has a shed with a roof where people can go inside when it is raining. It also has a half dozen free parking spaces along the tracks on the southeast corner of the railroad crossing at Providence Road.

Providence Road station is the location where the Route 101 line leaves State Street and enters a separate right-of-way. A storage track begins east of Providence Road across from the station shed that eventually becomes the second track. Additionally, a shopping center exists along Baltimore Pike between North Providence and Beatty Roads, which has a stop of its own.

Station layout

References

External links
 

 Station from Providence Road from Google Maps Street View

SEPTA Media–Sharon Hill Line stations